The 2004–05 Cupa României was the 67th season of the annual Romanian football knockout tournament.

The winners of the competition qualified for the second qualifying round of the 2005–06 UEFA Cup.

First round proper

|colspan=3 style="background-color:#97DEFF;"|13 October 2004

 

|}

Second round proper

|colspan=3 style="background-color:#97DEFF;"|27 November 2004

|}

Quarter-finals 
This phase was programmed on a two leg system. The games took place on 10 November and 1 December 2004.

|}

Semi-finals 
This phase was programmed on a two leg system. The games took place on 16 March and 13 April 2005.

|}

Final

References
 Romanian Cup 2004/2005 (RomanianSoccer)

Romania
Cupa Romaniei, 2004-05
Cupa României seasons